What We Could Be is a 2022 Philippine television drama romance series broadcast by GMA Network. Directed by Jeffrey Jeturian, it stars Miguel Tanfelix, Ysabel Ortega and Yasser Marta. It premiered on August 29, 2022 on the network's Telebabad line up replacing Bolera. The series concluded on October 27, 2022 with a total of 40 episodes. It was replaced by Mano Po Legacy: The Flower Sisters in its timeslot.

Cast and characters
Lead cast
 Miguel Tanfelix as Franco R. Luciano
 Ysabel Ortega as Cynthia Macaraeg-Luciano
 Yasser Marta as Lucas Relosa

Supporting cast
 Joyce Anne Burton as Helena "Helen" Relosa-Luciano
 Soliman Cruz as Tirso Macaraeg
 Aleck Bovick as Melba Macaraeg
 Bimbo Bautista as Gabriel "Gabby" Relosa
 Art Acuña as Bruno Panlilo
 Joel Saracho as Antonio "Tonyo" Cruz
 Vince Crisostomo as Justin Macaraeg
 Pamela Prinster as Criselda Garcia
 Hailey Mendes as Vera Panlilo
 Lia Salvador as Eloisa
 EJ Jallorina as Ate Vi

Guest cast
 Celeste Legaspi as Leonora "Onor" Maravilla

Episodes
<onlyinclude>

References

External links
 
 

2022 Philippine television series debuts
2022 Philippine television series endings
Filipino-language television shows
GMA Network drama series
Philippine romance television series
Television shows set in the Philippines